Ray Stephens (December 14, 1954 – October 4, 1990) was an American singer and actor best known for starring in the 1980s TV series, The Great Space Coaster, as Roy. In 1985, Stephens became the lead singer of Village People and toured England with the group that year. His sole recording with the group was their album, Sex Over the Phone.

Stephens is heard singing the tune "Cat's Eye" during the closing credits of the 1985 Stephen King film of the same title; however, he is incorrectly listed in the closing credits as "Ray Stevens."

Death
He died at age 35 on October 4, 1990, from AIDS.

External links

1954 births
1990 deaths
African-American male singers
American male pop singers
Village People members
20th-century American singers
AIDS-related deaths in California
20th-century American male singers